Morelia may refer to:

Mexico: 
 Morelia, capital of the state of Michoacán 
 Morelia, Chiapas, a hamlet in the municipality of Altamirano 
Colombia: 
 Morelia, Caquetá, a municipality 
Genera:
 Morelia (snake), a genus of pythons found in Australia, Indonesia and New Guinea
 Morelia (plant), a genus of plants (family Rubiaceae)
Other:
 Monarcas Morelia (aka "el Morelia"), a Mexican football team
 Morelia (TV series), a Mexican telenovela
The theme song from the telenovela performed by Cristian Castro and included on the album El Deseo de Oír Tu Voz
Morelia, a 2019 novel by Renee Gladman